Tomáš Ladra (born 24 April 1997) is a professional Czech football midfielder currently playing for FK Mladá Boleslav.

Career
He made his senior league debut for FK Pardubice on 7 August 2016 in their Czech National Football League 3–0 away loss against FK Varnsdorf. His first match for FK Mladá Boleslav in the Czech First League was on 17 February 2018 against MFK Karviná.

References

External links

Tomáš Ladra official international statistics

Czech footballers
Czech Republic youth international footballers
1997 births
Living people
Czech National Football League players
Association football midfielders
Czech First League players
FK Mladá Boleslav players
FK Pardubice players
FK Jablonec players
People from Česká Lípa
Czech Republic under-21 international footballers
Sportspeople from the Liberec Region